Mario Binato (born 22 September 1940) is a former Italian male long-distance runner who competed at one edition of the IAAF World Cross Country Championships at senior level (1973),

References

External links
 

1940 births
Living people
Italian male long-distance runners
Italian male cross country runners